Edward Peter Mathers  (19 August 1850, Edinburgh – 13 October 1924, Kensington) was a British author, editor, and newspaper proprietor.

Edward P. Mathers was educated at the Royal High School, Edinburgh and at the Edinburgh Institution for Languages and Mathematics. He was a journalist in England until 1878 when he emigrated from England to the British colony of South Africa. There he worked for various newspapers and became the founder-editor of the Natal Advertiser, a newspaper which was published until 1937. The Natal Advertiser publicized the prospects for wealth from gold mining and fully supported British imperialism. Mathers also wrote guides and handbooks for British migrants. In the 1880s he travelled throughout the Transvaal gold fields, wrote about them, and became the first journalist to foretell their great future prospects. He returned to England in 1888, founded the weekly newspaper South Africa, and inaugurated annual South African dinners in London. The newspaper South Africa was published from 1889 to 1961.

In Durban on 6 August 1885 Mathers married Mary Augusta Powys, a daughter of R. H. Powys who was a cousin of Thomas Powys, 4th Baron Lilford. The marriage produced one son, Edward Powys Mathers, and three daughters.

Selected publications

References

1850 births
1924 deaths
Burials at the Grange Cemetery
People educated at the Royal High School, Edinburgh
People educated at Stewart's Melville College
19th-century British journalists
20th-century British journalists